The 2021 Castrol Toyota Racing Series was the seventeenth running of the Toyota Racing Series, the premier open-wheel motorsport category held in New Zealand. The series consisted of nine races at three meetings. It began on 24 January at Hampton Downs, in Waikato, and concluded on 14 February at Manfeild, Feilding. The season opener also hosted the 66th running of the New Zealand Grand Prix. The 2021 Toyota Racing Series was the first season in which no individual race teams were running and all drivers were under a Toyota Racing banner. This was due to the COVID situation.

Teams and drivers

Changes

Sporting 
To compensate for the shortened calendar, the race distances were increased, from 50 and 70 kilometers to 70 and 80 kilometers respectively.

Race calendar 
The 2021 calendar was announced on 17 November 2020. Heavy border restrictions in New Zealand because of the COVID-19 pandemic resulted in a shortened calendar compared to traditional seasons, with only three race weekends at two circuits, limited to the North Island.

Championship standings

Drivers' championship

Notes

References

External links 

 

Toyota Racing Series
Toyota Racing Series
Toyota Racing Series
Toy
Toy
Toyota Racing Series